The canton of Montfort-sur-Meu is an administrative division of the Ille-et-Vilaine department, in northwestern France. At the French canton reorganisation which came into effect in March 2015, it was expanded from 11 to 15 communes. Its seat is in Montfort-sur-Meu.

It consists of the following communes: 
 
Bédée 
Breteil
Iffendic
Maxent
Monterfil
Montfort-sur-Meu
La Nouaye
Paimpont
Plélan-le-Grand
Pleumeleuc
Saint-Gonlay
Saint-Péran
Saint-Thurial
Talensac
Treffendel

References

Cantons of Ille-et-Vilaine